Earl Richmond may refer to:
 Earl Richmond (broadcaster)
 Earl Richmond (serial killer)

See also
 Earl of Richmond